Calantica is a genus of barnacles in the family Calanticidae, containing the following species:

Calantica affinis Broch, 1922
Calantica darwini Jones & Hosie, 2009
Calantica eos (Pilsbry, 1907)
Calantica flagellata Ren, 1989
Calantica gemma 
Calantica kampeni (Annandale, 1909)
Calantica kruegeri Hiro, 1932
Calantica pedunculostriata Broch, 1931
Calantica pollicipedoides (Hoek, 1907)
Calantica pusilla Utinomi, 1970
Calantica quinquelatera Hiro, 1932
Calantica siemensi (Weltner, 1922)
Calantica spinosa (Quoy & Gaimard, 1834)
Calantica studeri (Weltner, 1922)
Calantica trispinosa (Hoek, 1883)
Calantica villosa (Leach, 1824)

References

Barnacles